The Sugar Duties Act 1846 (9 & 10 Vict) was a statute of the United Kingdom which equalized import duties for sugar from British colonies. It was passed in 1846 at the same time as the repeal of the Corn laws by the Importation Act 1846 (9 & 10 Vict. c. 22). The Act, combined with the recent abolition of slavery, had a devastating effect on the profits of the Caribbean plantocracy, which had previously enjoyed reduced import duties. There were in fact two Sugar Duties Acts in 1846 (c.41 and c.63), one being a replacement for the other.

With no cheap labour force and no preferential tariff protection, the plantation-owners in the British West Indies could not compete with Cuba and Brazil, where sugar was still produced using slave labour.  The rise of European sugar beet as a cheap alternative to sugarcane further worsened their position. Plantation owners in the West Indies felt betrayed by the legislation, as they had understood that the tariff protection would remain in place as a quid pro quo for their agreement to the abolition of slavery eight years earlier.

External links
Article relating to the passing of the Sugar Duties Act

1846 in British law
United Kingdom Acts of Parliament 1846
History of sugar
Agriculture in the Caribbean
Agriculture legislation in the United Kingdom